Emperor Hui of Jin (260 – January 8, 307), personal name Sima Zhong (司馬衷), courtesy name Zhengdu (正度), was the second emperor of the Jin dynasty (266–420). Emperor Hui was a developmentally disabled ruler, and throughout his reign, there was constant internecine fighting between regents, imperial princes (his uncles and cousins), and his wife Empress Jia Nanfeng for the right to control him (and therefore the imperial administration), causing great suffering for the people and greatly undermining the stability of the Western Jin dynasty, eventually leading to rebellions of the Five Barbarians that led to Jin's loss of northern and central China and the establishment of the competing Sixteen Kingdoms. He was briefly deposed by his granduncle Sima Lun, who usurped the throne himself, in 301, but later that year was restored to the throne and continued to be the emperor until 307, when he was poisoned, likely by the regent Sima Yue.

Life prior to ascension
Sima Zhong was born to Sima Yan and his wife Yang Yan in 259 AD, while Sima Yan was still the assistant to his father, the Cao Wei regent Sima Zhao.  He was their second son, but after the early death of his older brother Sima Gui (司馬軌), he became the oldest surviving son.  It is not known when his developmental disabilities became apparent, but, in any case, after Sima Zhao died in September 265, and Sima Yan subsequently forced the Cao Wei emperor Cao Huan to abdicate to him in February 266 (which ended Cao Wei's reign and started Jin's as Emperor Wu), he made the seven-year-old Prince Zhong crown prince in 267 AD.

As Crown Prince Zhong grew in age, his developmental disabilities became clear to his parents and the imperial officials alike.  He learned how to write and speak, but appeared to be unable to make logical decisions on his own at all.  Once, when he heard frogs croaking, he asked, in all seriousness, "Do they croak because they want to, or because the government ordered them to?"  Several times, officials reminded Emperor Wu of this, but Emperor Wu, not realizing the extent of Crown Prince Zhong's disability, resisted the implicit calls for him to be replaced.  Indeed, because Emperor Wu was concerned that many officials were impressed with his talented younger brother, Sima You the Prince of Qi and might want Prince You to replace him instead, he eventually had Prince You sent to his principality, and Prince You died in anger in 283.

In 272, at age 12, Crown Prince Zhong married Jia Chong's daughter Jia Nanfeng, who at 14 was two years older.  Crown Princess Jia was violent and jealous, but had her methods of controlling Crown Prince Zhong so that he both loved and feared her. They had four daughters during their marriage, but she would not bear his only son Sima Yu—whose mother Consort Xie Jiu was originally a concubine of Emperor Wu, but had been given to Crown Prince Zhong prior to his marriage to Crown Princess Jia, so that Consort Xie could teach him how to have sexual relations.  Consort Xie became pregnant and bore Sima Yu, who was much favored by his grandfather Emperor Wu.  Emperor Wu considered Prince Yu intelligent and very much like his own grandfather Sima Yi, and this played into his decision not to replace Crown Prince Zhong.  However, other than Consort Xie, no other concubine would bear Crown Prince Zhong a child—as several had been pregnant but each was murdered by Crown Princess Jia, in fits of jealousy.  (Emperor Wu, in anger, considered deposing Crown Princess Jia, but with the intercession of his second wife Empress Yang Zhi, he recalled Jia Chong's contributions to the establishment of Jin Dynasty, and decided to leave her in place.)

In 289, as Emperor Wu neared death, he considered whom to make the regent for Crown Prince Zhong.  He considered both Empress Yang's father Yang Jun and his uncle Sima Liang the Prince of Ru'nan, the most respected of the imperial princes. As a result, Yang Jun became fearful of Sima Liang and had him posted to the key city of Xuchang (許昌, in modern Xuchang, Henan). By 290, Emperor Wu resolved to let Yang and Sima Liang both be regents, but after he wrote his will, the will was seized by Yang Jun, who instead had another will promulgated in which Yang alone was named regent.  Emperor Wu died soon thereafter, and Crown Prince Zhong ascended the throne as Emperor Hui.  Crown Princess Jia became empress, and Prince Yu became crown prince.

Reign
During his 17-year reign, Emperor Hui would come under the control of a number of regents, never being able to assert authority on his own.  The rough succession order of the regents were:
 Yang Jun: 290–291
 Sima Liang/Wei Guan: 291
 Empress Jia Nanfeng: 291–300
 Sima Lun: 300–301
 Sima Jiong: 301–302
 Sima Ai: 302–304
 Sima Ying: 304
 Sima Yong: 304–306
 Sima Yue: 306–307

Regency of Yang Jun
Yang Jun quickly showed himself to be autocratic and incompetent, drawing the ire of many other nobles and officials.  He tried to appease them by making many bestowments of titles and honors among them, but this only brought further contempt for his actions.  He knew Emperor Hui's empress Jia Nanfeng to be strong-willed and treacherous, so he tried to put people loyal to him in charge of all the defense forces of the capital Luoyang, and also ordered that all edicts not only be signed by the emperor but also by Empress Dowager Yang before they could be promulgated.

Empress Jia, however, wanted to be involved in the government, and was angry that she was constantly rebuffed by Empress Dowager Yang and Yang Jun.  She therefore conspired with the eunuch Dong Meng (董猛) and the generals Meng Guan (孟觀) and Li Zhao (李肇) against the Yangs.  She tried to include Sima Liang into the conspiracy, but Sima Liang declined; instead, she persuaded Emperor Hui's brother, Sima Wei the Prince of Chu, to join her plan.  In 291, after Sima Wei returned to Luoyang from his defense post (Jing Province (荊州, modern Hubei and Hunan)) with his troops, a coup went into progress.

Empress Jia, who had her husband easily under her control, had him issue an edict declaring that Yang Jun had committed crimes and should be removed from his posts.  It also ordered Sima Wei and Sima Yao (司馬繇) the Duke of Dong'an to attack Yang's forces and defend against counterattacks.  Quickly, it became clear that Yang was in trouble.  Empress Dowager Yang, trapped in the palace herself, wrote an edict ordering assistance for Yang Jun and put it on arrows, shooting it out of the palace.  Empress Jia then made the bold declaration that Empress Dowager Yang was committing treason.  Yang Jun was quickly defeated, and his clan was massacred.  Empress Dowager Yang was deposed and imprisoned (and would die in 292 in imprisonment).  Sima Liang was recalled to serve as regent, along with the senior official Wei Guan.

Regency of Sima Liang and Wei Guan
To appease those who might have been angry and had overthrown Yang Jun, Sima Liang also widely promoted those who participated in the plot, and more than a thousand men were created marquesses.  He and Wei, however, did try to get the government on track, but Empress Jia continued to interfere with governmental matters.  They also became concerned about the violent temper of Sima Wei and therefore tried to strip him of his military command, but Sima Wei persuaded Empress Jia to let him keep his military command.  Sima Wei's assistants Qi Sheng (岐盛) and Gongsun Hong (公孫宏) thereafter falsely told Empress Jia that Sima Liang and Wei planned to depose the emperor.  Empress Jia, who had already resented Wei for having suggested that the heir selection be changed during Emperor Wu's reign, desired more direct control over the government, and therefore resolved to initiate a second coup d'état.

In summer 291, Empress Jia had Emperor Hui personally write an edict to Sima Wei, ordering him to have Sima Liang and Wei removed from their offices.  His forces thereby surrounded Sima Liang and Wei's mansions, and while both men's subordinates recommended resistance, they each declined and were easily captured.  Contrary to the edict's terms, both were killed—Sima Liang with his heir Sima Ju (司馬矩) and Wei with nine of his sons and grandsons.  Qi then suggested to Sima Wei to take the opportunity to massacre Empress Jia's relatives and take over the government himself, but Sima Wei hesitated— at the same time, Empress Jia came to the realization that if the murders of Sima Liang and Wei could be traced to her instigation, that would bring a political firestorm' also that Sima Wei could not be easily controlled.  She therefore publicly declared that Sima Wei had falsely issued the edict.  Sima Wei's troops abandoned him, and he was captured and executed.  Sima Liang and Wei were posthumously honored.  From this point on, Empress Jia became the undisputed power behind the throne for several years.

Regency of Empress Jia
Empress Jia was now in control in close association with several advisors that she trusted—the capable official Zhang Hua, her cousins Pei Wei and Jia Mo (賈模), and her nephew Jia Mi (originally named Han Mi but posthumously adopted into the line of Jia Chong's son Jia Limin (賈黎民)).  She also closely associated with her distant cousin-once-removed Guo Zhang (郭彰), her sister Jia Wu (賈午), and Emperor Wu's concubine Zhao Chan (趙粲).  She lacked self-control, and was violent and capricious in her ways, but Zhang, Pei, and Jia Mo were honest men who generally kept the government in order.  However, as she grew increasingly unbridled in her behavior (including committing adultery with many men and later murdering them to silence them), Zhang, Pei, and Jia Mo considered deposing her and replacing her with Crown Prince Yu's mother Consort Xie, but they hesitated and never took actual action.  After Jia Mo died in 299, it became even harder to control her actions.

In 296, the Di and Qiang of Qin (秦州, modern eastern Gansu) and Yong (雍州, modern central and northern Shaanxi) started a major rebellion against Jin Dynasty, and they supported the Di chieftain Qi Wannian to be emperor.  In 297, the Jin general Zhou Chu (周處), without support from the central government, was easily defeated by Qi.  A large group of refugees, most of Di ancestry, stricken by the famine that resulted from the warfare, fled south into Yi Province (modern Sichuan and Chongqing), led by Li Te.  (Several years later, they would eventually be forced into rebellion and peel away from Jin rule.)  In 299, Meng Guan was able to defeat Qi, but Qi foreshadowed much more serious non-Han rebellions of the future.  Later in 299, the mid-level official Jiang Tong (江統) would petition Empress Jia to have the five non-Han ethnicities (the Wu Hu) removed from the empire proper and relocated to regions outside the empire, but Empress Jia did not accept his suggestions.

The relationship between Empress Jia and Crown Prince Yu had always been an uneasy one.  Empress Jia's mother Guo Huai had constantly advised Empress Jia to treat Crown Prince Yu well, as her own son, and she advocated marrying Jia Mi's sister to Crown Prince Yu.  However, Empress Jia and Jia Wu opposed this, and instead married a daughter of the official Wang Yan to Crown Prince Yu.  (Wang had two daughters, but Empress Jia had Crown Prince Yu marry the less beautiful one and had Jia Mi marry the more beautiful one.)  After Lady Guo's death, the relationship between Empress Jia and Crown Prince Yu quickly deteriorated, as Jia Wu and Consort Zhao provoked difficulties between them.  Further, Crown Prince Yu and Jia Mi never liked each other, and Jia Mi, as a result, also advised Empress Jia to depose Crown Prince Yu.  In 299, Empress Jia agreed and took action.  When Crown Prince Yu was in the palace to make an official petition to have his ill son Sima Bin (司馬彬) created a prince, Empress Jia forced him to drink a large amount of wine and, once he was drunk, had him write out a statement in which he declared intention to murder the emperor and the empress and to take over as emperor.  Empress Jia presented the writing to the officials and initially wanted Crown Prince Yu executed—but after some resistance, she only had him deposed and reduced to the status of a commoner.  Crown Prince Yu's mother Consort Xie was executed, as was his favorite concubine Consort Jiang Jun (蔣俊).

In 300, under the advice of a prince she favored—Sima Lun the Prince of Zhao, Emperor Wu's uncle—Empress Jia decided to eliminate Crown Prince Yu as a threat.  She sent assassins and had Crown Prince Yu assassinated.  Sima Lun, however, had other plans—he wanted to have Empress Jia murder the crown prince so that he could use the murder as an excuse to overthrow her, and he started a coup later that year, killing Jia Mi, Zhang, Pei, and other associates of Empress Jia.  Empress Jia was deposed and later forced to commit suicide.  Sima Lun and his strategist Sun Xiu became the paramount authority.

Regency of and usurpation by Sima Lun
Sima Lun restored the late Crown Prince Yu's reputation and had his son, Sima Zang (司馬臧), created crown prince.  However, Sima Lun himself had designs on the throne, and he and Sun Xiu became partial to placing those who favored them in power.  Emperor Hui's brother, Sima Yun (司馬允) the Prince of Huai'nan, correctly determined what Sima Lun's ambitions were, and as a result, Sima Lun and Sun tried to strip Sima Yun's military command.  When Sima Yun read the edict ordering him to turn over the troops, he saw that it was Sun Xiu's handwriting—and became enraged and started a rebellion with his troops.  Initially, he had successes against Sima Lun's troops and was almost able to capture Sima Lun's mansion, during the course of one day.  Late in the day, Chen Zhun (陳準), who secretly supported Sima Yun, persuaded Emperor Hui to give him a banner that showed imperial support and was able to deliver it to Sima Yun, but his messenger, a friend of Sima Lun's son Sima Qian (司馬虔), instead tricked Sima Yun into receiving the banner and, as he did, cut off his head.  His troops disbanded after his death.

After defeating Sima Yun, Sima Lun became ever more intent on usurping the throne.  Late in 300, after Sun Xiu's suggestion, Sima Lun was granted the nine bestowments.  However, Sima Lun and his sons were themselves foolish and unintelligent, and Sun was the actual person in charge of the government.  In the winter, Sun had the granddaughter of his distant relative and friend Sun Qi (孫旂), Yang Xianrong, married to Emperor Hui to be his empress.

Also in winter 300, the governor of Yi Province, Zhao Xin (趙廞), a relative of Empress Jia, rebelled and tried to occupy Yi Province to be his own domain.  He associated with Li Te and his brother Li Xiang (李庠), and they soon were able to take over Yi Province.  However, he then became suspicious of the Li brothers' abilities, and he killed Li Xiang after Li Xiang suggested that he declare himself emperor.  Li Te, in anger, took his troops and killed Zhao.  Li then welcomed the new Jin governor Luo Shang to the provincial capital Chengdu (成都, in modern Chengdu, Sichuan), but maintained an uneasy relationship with Luo and Luo's main strategist, Xin Ran (辛冉), a former friend of his who deeply suspected his intentions.

In spring 301, Sima Lun had Emperor Hui yield the throne to him, and gave Emperor Hui the honorific title of retired emperor (太上皇).  In order to appease those who might be angry at his usurpation, he rewarded many people with honors.  Sun, in particular, was issuing edicts based on his own whims.  Suspecting three key princes – Sima Jiong the Prince of Qi (Emperor Hui's cousin and the son of Emperor Hui's uncle, Prince You of Qi), Sima Ying the Prince of Chengdu (Emperor Hui's brother), and Sima Yong the Prince of Hejian (the grandson of Emperor Hui's great-granduncle Sima Fu the Prince of Anping), each of whom had strong independent military commands—Sun sent his trusted subordinates to be their assistants.  Prince Jiong refused and declared a rebellion to restore Emperor Hui.  Prince Ying, Sima Ai the Prince of Changsha (Emperor Hui's brother), and Sima Xin (司馬歆) the Duke of Xinye (the son of a granduncle of Emperor Hui) all declared support for Prince Jiong.  Prince Yong initially sent his general Zhang Fang with intent to support Sima Lun, but then heard that Princes Jiong and Ying had great forces, and so declared for the rebels instead.  Sima Lun's forces were easily defeated by Princes Jiong and Ying's forces, and after just declaring himself emperor for three months, Sima Lun was captured by officials in Luoyang who declared for the rebellion as well, and forced to issue an edict returning the throne to Emperor Hui.  He was then forced to commit suicide.  Sun and other associates of Sima Lun were executed.

Some thought that a power balance that Emperor Wu had hoped for at his death might be restored, as Princes Jiong and Ying were each given regent titles (and awarded the nine bestowments, in one rare case where the nine bestowments were not signs of an impending usurpation, although Prince Ying declined the bestowments), and many talented officials were promoted into important positions.  However, the Princes Jiong and Ying were actually apprehensive of each other's power, and Prince Ying decided to yield the central government regency to Prince Jiong at the time and return to his defense post at Yecheng.

Regency of Sima Jiong
Meanwhile, Luo Shang ordered that the Qin/Yong refugees go home and that they surrender all property that they pillaged during the wars of Zhao's rebellion.  This caused great burden and fear on the refugees, and Li Te requested a one-year extension; Luo agreed, but Xin Ran and other officials under Luo were unhappy and secretly planned an attack on Li.  Li, anticipating that this might happen, was prepared, and he defeated Xin's forces easily.

In the capital, Sima Jiong became arrogant based on his accomplishments.  He had his sons created princes, and ran the matters of the central government from his mansion, rarely visiting the emperor or attending the imperial meetings.  He enlarged his mansion to be as large as the palace, and he entrusted matters to people who were close to him, and would not change his ways even when some of his more honest associates tried to change his behavior.  When Emperor Hui's grandsons Sima Zang and Sima Shang (司馬尚), successive crown princes, died in childhood, leaving Emperor Hui without male descendants by 302, Sima Ying was considered the appropriate successor, but Sima Jiong chose to bypass him by recommending the seven-year-old Sima Qin (司馬覃) the Prince of Qinghe (Emperor Hui's nephew and the son of his brother Sima Xia (司馬遐)) as the crown prince, with intent to easily control the young Crown Prince Qin.

Sima Jiong became suspicious of Sima Yong the Prince of Hejian—because Sima Yong had initially wanted to support Sima Lun, until he saw that Sima Lun's cause was hopeless.  Sima Yong knew of Sima Jiong's suspicion, and started a conspiracy; he invited Sima Ai the Prince of Changsha to overthrow Sima Jiong, believing that Sima Ai would fail; his plan was then to, in conjunction with Sima Ying, start a war against Sima Jiong.  Once they were victorious, he would depose Emperor Hui and make Sima Ying the emperor, and then serve as Sima Ying's prime minister.  In winter 302, Sima Yong declared his rebellion, and Sima Ying soon joined, despite opposition from his strategist Lu Zhi (盧志).  Hearing that Sima Ai was part of the conspiracy as well, Sima Jiong made a preemptive strike against Sima Ai, but Sima Ai was prepared and entered the palace to control Emperor Hui.  After a street battle, Sima Jiong's forces collapsed, and he was executed.  Sima Ai became the effective regent, but in order to reduce opposition, he submitted all important matters to Sima Ying, still stationed at Yecheng.

Regency of Sima Ai
Sima Ai, of the princes, appeared to be the only one who saw the importance of formally honoring Emperor Hui while maintaining resemblance to impartial governance.  He continued to try to share power with Sima Ying.

Meanwhile, in Yi Province, in 303, Luo Shang, after causing Li Te to be ready by offering a truce, made a surprise attack against Li's forces and killed him.  Li's forces fell under the command of his brother Li Liu, who died later that year as well and was succeeded by his nephew Li Xiong.  Under Li Xiong's command, the refugee forces were able to defeat not only Luo's forces but also reinforcements sent by Jing Province (荊州, modern Hubei and Hunan).  At the same time of Li's successes, many agrarian rebellions also started throughout the empire, including one that defeated the forces of the powerful Sima Xin the Prince of Xinye and killed him.

In fall 303, Sima Yong, dissatisfied that his plan did not come to fruition, persuaded Sima Ying to again join him against Sima Ai.  While Sima Yong and Sima Ying had overwhelming force, their forces could not score a conclusive victory against Sima Ai.  Sima Yong's forces were about to withdraw in spring 304 when Sima Yue the Prince of Donghai, the grandson of a great-granduncle of Emperor Hui, believing that Sima Ai could not win this war, arrested him and delivered him to Sima Yong's general Zhang Fang, who executed Sima Ai cruelly by burning him to death.  Sima Ying became in effective control of the government, but continued to control it remotely from Yecheng.

Regency of Sima Ying
Once Sima Ying became in effective control of the government, he deposed Crown Prince Qin and made himself crown prince instead, and he also deposed Empress Yang—the first of four times she would be deposed during a duration of two years.  He became arrogant and extravagant, and the people became disappointed.  Seeing this, Sima Yue decided to resist; he welcomed Empress Yang and Crown Prince Qin back to their positions, and, in Emperor Hui's name, set out to attack Sima Ying.  His forces were defeated by Sima Ying's, and he fled, leaving Emperor Hui in Sima Ying's hands at Yecheng.  Sima Yong's forces entered Luoyang and deposed Empress Yang and Crown Prince Qin again.

Wang Jun, the military commander of You Province (幽州, modern Beijing, Tianjin, and northern Hebei), who had an uneasy relationship with Sima Ying up to this point, then declared war against Sima Ying and headed south with his troops, allied with various Xianbei and Wuhuan tribes.  Sima Ying found it difficult to resist them, and he sent one of his subordinates, the Xiongnu noble Liu Yuan, to his own tribesmen to ask them to join him.  Once Liu left, however, Sima Ying's forces collapsed.  When Liu heard this, instead of bringing his forces to Sima Ying's aid, he declared independence and entitled himself the Prince of Han—claiming rightful inheritance of Han Dynasty, as he claimed to be descended from a Han princess who had married a Xiongnu chanyu – and thus establishing Han Zhao.  (A month earlier, Li Xiong had declared himself independent of Jin as well, as the Prince of Chengdu, establishing Cheng Han; these two states would be the first two of the Sixteen Kingdoms.)

Sima Ying fled back to Luoyang with Emperor Hui, but now with no forces backing him.  Sima Yong, in control of the situation, decided to directly take control without using Sima Ying any longer, and Sima Ying was removed from the crown prince position and replaced with another brother of Emperor Hui's – Sima Chi the Prince of Yuzhang, who was considered studious and humble.  Sima Yong also had Zhang Fang forcibly move Emperor Hui to Chang'an (in modern Xi'an, Shaanxi), directly under his own grasp.  However, a number of high-level officials remained in Luoyang and formed a separate government that was partially allied with and partially rivalling Sima Yong's.

Regency of Sima Yong
Sima Yong tried to appease possible opposing forces by promoting all of the major princes and warlords, but his promotions did not have the desired effect.  Meanwhile, Han Zhao attracted those Han and non-Han agrarians and tribesmen disappointed in Jin rule, and began to grow in size and power.

At the same time, however, the Jin infighting continued.  In the fall of 305, Sima Yue declared yet another rebellion, this time against Sima Yong, claiming that Sima Yong had improperly forced Emperor Hui to move the capital.  Various provincial governors and military commanders were forced to be on one side or the other.  The war was initially inconclusive.  In early 306, after a few victories by Sima Yue, Sima Yong became fearful, and he executed Zhang to seek peace; Sima Yue refused.  By summer 306, Sima Yong was forced to abandon both Chang'an and Emperor Hui, and Sima Yue's forces welcomed Emperor Hui back to Luoyang and restored Empress Yang.

Also in 306, both Li Xiong and Liu Yuan declared themselves emperors, even more clearly breaking from Jin.

Regency of Sima Yue and death
Sima Yue served as regent for Emperor Hui for several months until winter 306 when, for an unknown reason, Emperor Hui was poisoned while eating bread.  (Historians commonly accept Sima Yue as the culprit, but the motive is not clear.)  Thus ended the reign of an emperor who suffered much and under whose reign the Jin dynastic system came crashing down, even though he himself should probably not be blamed for it.  Crown Prince Chi succeeded him (as Emperor Huai) and would try to restrengthen the empire, but it was too late for Jin by that point.  It would end up losing northern and central China to Han Zhao and be forced to relocate to southern China, continued in a branch line of the imperial clan.

Trivia

The Book of Jin, a 7th-century chronicle of the Chinese Jin Dynasty, reports that when Emperor Hui (259–307) of Western Jin was told that his people were starving because there was no rice, he said, "Why don't they eat porridge with (ground) meat?" (何不食肉糜), showing his unfitness. It has since then become a famous phrase in both classical and modern Chinese. It is analogous to the phrase "Let them eat cake" in French culture.

Heirs
 290–300: Sima Yu, Crown Prince Minhuai 湣懷太子司馬遹 (son of Emperor Hui)
 300–301: Sima Zang, Crown Prince Minchong 湣衝太孫司馬臧 (son of Crown Prince Minhuai)
 301–302: Sima Shang, Crown Prince Huaichong 懷衝太孫司馬尚 (son of Crown Prince Minhuai)
 302–304: Sima Tan 司馬覃 (nephew of Emperor Hui)
 304–304: Sima Ying, Prince of Chengdu 成都王司馬穎 (brother of Emperor Hui)
 304–304: Sima Chi, Prince of Yuzhang 豫章王司馬熾 (brother of Emperor Hui)

Era names
 Yongxi (永熙 yǒng xī) May 17, 290 – February 15, 291
 Yongping (永平 yǒng píng)  February 16 – April 23, 291
 Yuankang (元康 yuán kāng) April 24, 291 – February 6, 300
 Yongkang (永康 yǒng kāng) February 7, 300 – February 3, 301
 Yongning (永寧 yǒng níng) June 1, 301 – January 4, 303
 Tai'an (太安 tài ān) January 5, 303 – February 21, 304
 Yongan (永安 yǒng ān) February 22 – August 15, 304; December 14, 304 – February 11, 305
 Jianwu (建武 jiàn wǔ) August 16 – December 13, 304
 Yongxing (永興 yǒng xīng) February 12, 305 – July 12, 306
 Guangxi (光熙 guāng xī) July 13, 306 – February 19, 307

Family
Consorts and Issue:
 Empress Huijia, of the Jia clan (257–300), personal name Nanfeng (南風)
 Princess Hedong, personal name Xuanhua
 Married Sun Hui (d. 301) in 300
 Married Fu Xuan
 Princess Shiping, personal name Nüyan
 Empress Xianwen, of the Yang clan of Taishan (d. 322), personal name Xianrong
 Princess Linhai
 Married Cao Tong
 Shuyuan, of the Xie clan (d. 300), personal name Jiu
 Sima Yu, Crown Prince Minhuai (278–300), first son

Ancestry

References

 Fang, Xuanling. Book of Jin (Jin Shu).

259 births
307 deaths
Monarchs who abdicated
Jin dynasty (266–420) emperors
Murdered Chinese emperors
Assassinated Chinese people
People murdered in China
Royalty and nobility with disabilities
4th-century Chinese monarchs
3rd-century Chinese monarchs